Rama Reddy Palem is a village in Chillakur mandal, Nellore district. The primary occupation is agriculture.

References

Villages in Nellore district